The Wesleyan Methodist Chapel is a Grade II listed building  in Grove Road, Harrogate, North Yorkshire, England. It was built in 1896 as a 1,000-seat Wesleyan Methodist chapel but has since been converted into a six-bedroom house.

References

Grade II listed churches in North Yorkshire
Churches in Harrogate
Former churches in North Yorkshire
Methodist churches in North Yorkshire